Tom Lewis (born 5 January 1991) is a professional golfer who plays on the European Tour and the PGA Tour.

Amateur career
In 2009, Lewis won the Boys Amateur Championship at Royal St George's. In 2010, he lost to Peter O'Malley in a playoff for the New South Wales Open, and then tied for 12th place at the Australian Open. This was followed by victory on the Old Course at St Andrews in the 2011 St Andrews Links Trophy.

Lewis qualified for the 2011 Open Championship at Royal St George's via Local Final Qualifying at Rye. In the first round he shot a five-under-par 65, giving him a share of the lead alongside Thomas Bjørn. This was the lowest single-round score by an amateur in Open Championship history, and the equal lowest in any major championship. It made him the first amateur to lead a major after a round since Mike Reid in the 1976 U.S. Open and the first amateur to lead the Open Championship since Michael Bonallack in 1968. One of Lewis's first-round partners was Tom Watson, after whom he is named. Lewis finished tied for 30th place and as the low amateur, he won the Silver Medal.

Professional career
Lewis turned professional after the 2011 Walker Cup. He made his professional debut at the Austrian Golf Open in September, shooting a two-over-par 74 in the first round. He recovered to finish in a tie for tenth. His maiden professional win came the following month at the Portugal Masters on the European Tour, shooting rounds of 70, 64, 68, and 65 to finish two shots clear of the field. It was his third professional start. In December he was crowned the European Tour's Sir Henry Cotton Rookie of the Year.

Lewis played on the European Tour from 2012 with limited success. He lost his place after the 2016 season but regained it after a good performance at Q-school.

Lewis showed a return to form in 2018. He played a number of the Challenge Tour events. He was joint third in the Swedish Challenge in August before winning the Bridgestone Challenge in September and finish joint third again in the Kazakhstan Open the following week. A week later he won his second Portugal Masters title on the European Tour. He had four other top-10 finishes on the European Tour, including a tie for fifth place in the Sky Sports British Masters and a tie for seventh in the DP World Tour Championship, Dubai. He finished 41st in the Order of Merit.

On 2 September 2019, Lewis won the Korn Ferry Tour Championship and earned his PGA Tour card for the 2019–20 season. It was his first career Korn Ferry start, qualifying for the Finals by earning enough points as a PGA Tour non-member.

Lewis finished as a runner-up in August 2020 at the WGC-FedEx St. Jude Invitational, three strokes behind winner Justin Thomas. This was Lewis' career best finish on the PGA Tour to date.

Amateur wins
2009 Carris Trophy, Boys Amateur Championship
2011 St Andrews Links Trophy

Source:

Professional wins (4)

European Tour wins (2)

Korn Ferry Tour wins (1)

Challenge Tour wins (1)

Playoff record
PGA Tour of Australasia playoff record (0–1)

Results in major championships
Results not in chronological order in 2020.

LA = Low Amateur
CUT = missed the half-way cut
"T" = tied
NT = No tournament due to COVID-19 pandemic

Results in The Players Championship

CUT = missed the halfway cut

Results in World Golf Championships
Results not in chronological order before 2015.

1Cancelled due to COVID-19 pandemic

NT = No tournament"T" = Tied

Team appearances
Amateur
European Boys' Team Championship (representing England): 2008, 2009
Jacques Léglise Trophy (representing Great Britain & Ireland): 2008 (winners), 2009 (winners)
European Amateur Team Championship (representing England): 2010 (winners)
Eisenhower Trophy (representing England): 2010
St Andrews Trophy (representing Great Britain & Ireland): 2010
Walker Cup (representing Great Britain & Ireland): 2011 (winners)

See also
2016 European Tour Qualifying School graduates
2019 Korn Ferry Tour Finals graduates

References

External links

Profile at ESPN

English male golfers
PGA Tour golfers
Korn Ferry Tour graduates
Sportspeople from Welwyn Garden City
1991 births
Living people